The Wateree River, about 75 mi (120 km) long, is a tributary of the Santee River in central South Carolina in the United States, which flows to the Atlantic Ocean. It was named for the Wateree Native Americans, a tribe who had migrated to this area from western North Carolina. They lived here until the early 18th century, when they were set upon and displaced by mostly English settlers during the Yamasee War. Survivors merged with the larger Catawba people, becoming extinct as a tribe.

Course
The Wateree River is a continuation of the Catawba River, which flows from the Blue Ridge Mountains in North Carolina; this river had the different names of Catawba and Wateree assigned to different sections by different groups of settlers. 

Today the name change is marked at the point where Wateree Creek empties into Lake Wateree. This is a manmade lake formed by Wateree Hydro Station Dam, a Duke Energy hydroelectric project built in the 20th century in Kershaw County, South Carolina.  

The Wateree flows generally southward through Kershaw County and along the common boundary of Richland and Sumter counties, past the Piedmont town of Camden. It joins the Congaree River to form the Santee River about 35 mi (55 km) southeast of Columbia.

Crossings
The following is a list of crossings along the short length of the Wateree
US Route 1/US 601 in Camden & Lugoff
Railroad bridge in Camden
Interstate 20 in Camden
Garner's Ferry Road US 378 near Stateburg & Eastover
Two railroad bridges near the confluence with the Congaree River near Eastover

See also
List of South Carolina rivers

References

Sources
Columbia Gazetteer of North America entry
DeLorme (1998).  South Carolina Atlas & Gazetteer.  Yarmouth, Maine: DeLorme.  .
, retrieved 6 February 2006

Further reading
 Lewis, Kenneth E. The Carolina Backcountry Venture: Tradition, Capital, and Circumstance in the Development of Camden and the Wateree Valley, 1740—1810 (University of South Carolina Press, 2017. xviii, 436 pp.

Rivers of South Carolina
Rivers of Kershaw County, South Carolina
Rivers of Richland County, South Carolina
Rivers of Sumter County, South Carolina
Tributaries of the Santee River